South Branch Depot also known as South Branch is an unincorporated community in Hampshire County in the U.S. state of West Virginia. Originally known as Forks of Potomac because of its proximity to the confluence of the North and South Branches of the Potomac River and then later in the early 20th century as French's Station and then simply South Branch, South Branch Depot served as a depot and post office on the Baltimore & Ohio Railroad since the railroad was constructed there in the 1840s. Today, South Branch Depot may only be reached from Levels by way of Frenches Station Road (County Route 5/7).

References

External links 

Unincorporated communities in Hampshire County, West Virginia
Unincorporated communities in West Virginia
Baltimore and Ohio Railroad
West Virginia populated places on the Potomac River